Roxanne Tessa Lisa Wilson (born March 17, 1979) started her career as an appellate attorney in Austin, Texas. She is currently a public speaker and Jazzercise franchisee. She was television host for The Liquidation Channel and a contestant on the hit NBC reality TV show The Apprentice 5 with Donald Trump. She was fired in week 14 as the first African American woman to make the final four.

Early life
Roxanne was born in Ames, Iowa, as the middle of three girls and the first American-born in her family. Her family is originally from Trinidad and Tobago. 
She earned a business degree in economics from Baylor University while also being a member of the Baylor University Chamber of Commerce; the oldest organization and all-male fraternity which accepted Roxanne as the first female. She has clerked for two justices on the Supreme Court of Texas.
She earned her J.D. degree from the University of Michigan.

Professional career
Roxanne Wilson worked for a premiere Texas law firm and clerked for two justices on the Supreme Court of Texas after earning a law degree at the University of Michigan. She was a host on The Liquidation Channel, a blogger, social media enthusiast, Jazzercise instructor, author, and well-traveled speaker. Roxanne hosts webisodes around Austin, "On The Road With Roxanne."

Roxanne became a Jazzercise Franchisee in 2001 and owns  and operates Jazzercise Riata in Austin, Texas where she teaches weekly.

Broadcasting
Roxanne was a contestant in season five of NBC's The Apprentice with Donald Trump, being the first African-American woman to compete in the final four on the NBC hit show.

Roxanne co-hosted Texas' Christian talent search program, Inspire the Desire.

She co-hosted Family Friendly Mornings on Austin's Contemporary Christian station, 105.9 The River for two years.

Roxanne joined the Liquidation Channel in 2010. Within eighteen months  Roxanne moved from 'night owl' to prime time host on the twenty-four hour international home shopping network. 
In 2012 Roxanne debuted the Liquidation Channel's hit specialty show "Creature Couture," featuring animal jewelry and lifestyle products.

Publications
With The Apprentice TV show as the background, Roxanne's book Footprints in the Boardroom explains how modern believers can use their faith to overcome modern day challenges, especially in a dog-eat-dog business world.

Humanitarian interests
Roxanne is a member of the Junior League of Austin and serves as mentor to the high school girls at her church, Riverbend. Roxanne served as spokesperson for the Make-A-Wish Foundation Destination Joy campaign presented by Lay's and on the Susan G. Komen Breast Cancer Foundation Austin  Board of Directors, and teamed up with Scott & White and Entercom Austin to promote Balance Austin, a program dedicated to educating women on the importance of life balance.

Personal life
Roxanne resides in Austin, Texas with her Yorkie, Bear.

References

External links
Official Site
Roxanne on Twitter

Talent profile of Roxanne Wilson on SlateCast.com
NBC Bio

1979 births
Living people
Baylor University alumni
University of Michigan Law School alumni
People from Austin, Texas
21st-century American businesspeople
American Christians
American women lawyers
Texas lawyers
American people of Trinidad and Tobago descent
African-American television hosts
The Apprentice (franchise) contestants
Participants in American reality television series
21st-century American women